Syed Sulaiman Nadvi (—; 22 November 1884 – 22 November 1953) was a Pakistani historian, writer and scholar of Islam. He co-authored Sirat-un-Nabi and wrote Khutbat-e-Madras. He was a member of the founding committee of Jamia Millia Islamia.

Early life and education 
Sulaiman Nadvi Nadvi was born on 22 November 1884 in Desna, a village of Nalanda District, Bihar, India (then in the Patna District, in the Bengal Presidency of British India). His father, Hakeem Sayyed Abul Hasan was a Sufi.

Sulaiman Nadvi was influenced by Shibli Nomani at Lucknow. In 1906, he graduated from Nadva. In 1908, Nadvi was appointed as an instructor of Modern Arabic and Theology at Dar-ul-Uloom Nadva. His contemporary at Nadva was Abul Kalam Azad who had come from Calcutta and also joined the Nadva.
Both Sulaiman Nadvi and Abul Kalam Azad were favorite pupils of Maulana Shibli Nomani. Sulaiman Nadvi became one of the biographers of the Prophet of Islam and a historian during his own lifetime.

Aligarh Muslim University conferred on him the honorary degree of Doctorate of Literature (DLitt) in 1941.

Contribution to Islamic literature 
In 1933, he published one of his major works, Khayyam. The nucleus of this book was an article on the noted Persian scholar and poet Omar Khayyam.

Sulaiman Nadvi, along with others who favored Hindu-Muslim unity in British India, suggested that the term "Urdu" be abandoned in favour of "Hindustani" because the former conjured up the image of a military conquest and war whereas the latter had no such symbolic baggage.

Sulaiman Nadvi founded Darul Musannifeen (Academy of Authors), also known as the Shibli Academy, at Azamgarh. The first book published there was Ard-ul-Quran (2 volumes).

Later life and death 

In June 1950, Nadvi moved to Pakistan and settled in Karachi. He was appointed Chairman of Taleemat-e-Islami Board to advise on Islamic aspects of Pakistan's Constitution. He died on 22 November 1953 in Karachi at the age of 69.

However, his son Salman Nadwi asserts that they didn't move to Pakistan with the intention of migration. Right after they reached Pakistan, Sulaiman Nadwi's health deteriorated and he tried unsuccessfully to get his permit extended from the Indian embassy, which caused grief and pain.

Literary work
Nadvi's works include:
Ahl-us-Sunnah-wal-Jamā‘ah
The Arab Navigation, lectures delivered in Bombay during March 1931.
Khayyam (about the contributions of Omar Khayyam, published in 1933)
Khutbat-e-madras
Rahmat-e-Aalam
Seerat-e-Aisha
Sirat-un-Nabi (Life of the Prophet) by first Shibli Nomani, the teacher of Sulaiman Nadvi. Shibli started writing this book, which was later finished by Sulaiman Nadvi after Shibli’s death in 1914.

See also
 Shibli Nomani
 Muhammad Ali Jauhar
 Khilafat Movement
 Allama Muhammad Iqbal

References

Citations

More
BOOK REVIEWS - Sayyid Sulaiman Nadvi, Tarikh-i arz al-Qur'an
Sulaimān Nadvī The Arab navigation
Iqbal aur Syed Suleman Nadvi
Literary Services of Syed Suleman Al-Nadvi in Seerah al-Nabawiyah

 

1884 births
1953 deaths
20th-century Muslim scholars of Islam
Scholars from Bihar
Writers from Lucknow
People from Azamgarh
20th-century Indian historians
Pakistani people of Bihari descent
Urdu-language writers
Writers in British India
Writers from Karachi
Writers from Patna
Darul Uloom Nadwatul Ulama
Darul Uloom Nadwatul Ulama alumni
Founders of Indian schools and colleges
Deobandis
Disciples of Ashraf Ali Thanwi